Magda Bianchi Lázzari  is a Guatemalan diplomat, activist, and the former First Lady of Guatemala from 1991 until 1993. Wife of Jorge Serrano Elías, president of Guatemala.

Bianchi followed up on the activities initiated by her predecessor, Raquel Blandón. Bianchi is an activist who has focused on women's rights, children and the elderly, and issues affecting the disabled in Guatemala. She accompanied President Serrano Elías on many of his state visits.

After President Serrano dissolved the Congress and initiated the "Serranazo" the Constitutional Court declared the decisions taken by the President null and void, also declared Vice President Gustavo Espina as illegitimate to succeed Serrano. Serrano and his wife went into exile in Panama where they currently reside.

References

Living people
First ladies of Guatemala
20th-century Guatemalan women politicians
20th-century Guatemalan politicians
Guatemalan people of Italian descent
1949 births